Hu Peisong (born May 1964) is a Chinese agronomist who is a researcher and the current president of .

Biography
Hu was born in Tonglu County, Zhejiang, in May 1964. He attended Zhejiang Agricultural University (now Zhejiang University) where he received his bachelor's degree in 1986. After completing his master's degree at the Graduate School of Chinese Academy of Agricultural Sciences, he attended Nanjing Agricultural University where he obtained his doctor's degree in 2002. Since 1991, he has been engaged in genetic improvement of rice quality.

Honours and awards
 November 22, 2019 Member of the Chinese Academy of Engineering (CAE)

References

External links
 

1964 births
Living people
People from Tonglu County
Scientists from Hangzhou
Zhejiang University alumni
Nanjing Agricultural University alumni
Members of the Chinese Academy of Engineering